Three Tigers in the movie: Jackpot is a 2022 Czech action comedy film. It is based on a comedy improvisational show Three Tigers. On August 8, 2022, it was released on Netflix.

Plot
The main characters of the film are Milan (Albert Čuba) and David Votrubek (Štěpán Kozub), who win the jackpot thanks to a lottery ticket, but for which they have to travel to Sazka's headquarters in Prague, which turns out to be a problem because they get lost on the way and eventually travel through Poland and Slovakia. On their heels are an incompetent policeman Robert (Robin Ferro) and unsuccessful actor Herbert (Vladimir Polák), who want to win the lottery for the mobster Král (Dušan Sitek). Král is struggling with financial problems and wants to take advantage of the stupidity and naivety of the main characters. However, little does he know that their journey together will bond the heroes together and he will have to use his best assassins to have a chance to win the lot.

Cast
 Albert Čuba as Milan
 Štěpán Kozub as David Votrubek
 Robin Ferro as Robert
 Vladimír Polák as Herbert
 Dušan Sitek as Král
 Sára Erlebachová as Zbyhněva
 Petr Sýkora as Bubák
 Markéta Matulová as Ambrózie
 Zbigniew Kalina as Priest

Reception
The film received mostly average to below-average ratings from Czech film critics.

In his review for Aktuálně.cz, Kamil Fila states that the Three Tigers are a phenomenon with a large audience, but the chosen format is not a film, but "a collection of sketches that do not hold together". In a review for the same periodical, Tomáš Stejskal states that in the film, Three Tigers lost the impact of its comedic scenes and that they do not find a way to make appropriate use of the aptly executed parodic passages. In a review for ČT art, Jan Jaroš writes that the humor in the film "does not take into account that the construction of a short sketch differs from the construction of a full-length story, which should not be a mere sum of such sketches".

The film was very successful on Czech Netflix beating with its ratings film such as The Gray Man or Carter.

References

External links
 

2022 films
2020s action comedy films
Czech action comedy films
2020s Czech-language films
Czech parody films